Marvelous Crown (19 March 1990 – 2 June 2007) was a Japanese Thoroughbred racehorse best known for winning the 1994 Japan Cup. He showed promise as a juvenile in 1992 but became increasingly temperamental and was gelded. He was off the course for ten months before returning to win three of his four races in the following year. As a four-year-old he showed steady improvement, winning the Grade III Kinko Sho and the Grade II Kyoto Daishoten before defeating a strong international field in the Japan Cup. He remained in training until 1997 but made only five more appearances before his career was ended by injury. He died in 2007.

Background
Marvelous Crown was a chestnut gelding with a white blaze bred in Japan by Hayata Bokujo. He was sired by Miswaki, a Florida-bred stallion who won the Prix de la Salamandre in 1980. Miswaki went on to become a very successful breeding stallion, siring many important winners including Urban Sea and Black Tie Affair. Marvelous Crown's dam Maurita was a New Zealand-bred mare who won the New Zealand Oaks in 1982 and also produced the Hollywood Turf Handicap-winner Grand Flotilla.

During his racing career Marvelous Crown was owned by Sadao Sasahara and trained by Makoto Osawa.

Racing career

1992: two-year-old season
Marvelous Crown began his racing career by winning a maiden race over 1200 metres on the dirt at Hanshin Racecourse on 19 September 1992. When moved up in distance to 1600 metres and switched to turf at Kyoto Racecourse in October he finished third to Biwa Hiyahide a colt who was voted Japanese Horse of the Year in the following year. In his two other starts in 1992, Marvelous Crown finished fourth at Kyoto in November and second when moved up to 2000 metres at Hanshin in December. Marvelous Crown began to show serious behavioural problems and was becoming dangerous to handle: his owner therefore took the decision to have him gelded.

1993: three-year-old season
As a gelding, Marvelous Crown was ineligible to contest many of the major Japanese races for three-year-olds including the Satsuki Sho, Tokyo Yushun and Kikuka Sho. He did not appear as a three-year-old until 16 October 1993 when he won a race over 1600 metres at Kyoto, beating Center the Eagle and fourteen others. At the same track in November he won the Kitaoji Tokubetsu and the Hiei Stakes, both over 2000 metres. On his final appearance of the season he was moved up in class and distance for the Grade II Naruo Kinen over 2500 metres at Hanshin on 11 December and finished second of the sixteen runners behind Roubles Act.

1994: four-year-old season
At Hanshin in January 1994 Marvelous Crown finished second to Eishin Tennessee in the Grade III Sports Nippon Sho Kim Pai over 2000 metres and then ran fourth over 2500 metres in the Grade II NIkkei Shinshun Hai. Later in spring he finished second to North Flight in the Yomiuri Milers Cup at Chukyo Racecourse, sixth in the Sankei Osaka Hai and second to Golden Hour in the Niigata Daishoten. After six consecutive defeats the gelding recorded his first major success when he defeated Fuji One Man Cross, Towa Darling and seven others in the Grade III Tokai TV Hai Kinko Sho over 1800 metres at Chukyo on 19 June. At the same course in July he ended the first part of his four-year-old campaign by finishing third to Nice Nature and Star Ballerina in the Takamatsunomiya Hai.

On 9 October Marvelous Crown was one of ten horses to contest the Grade II Kyoto Daishoten over 2500 metres at Hanshin. He won from Ayrton Symboli and Machikane Allegro in a record time of 2:31.0. The thirteenth running of the Japan Cup at Tokyo Racecourse saw four Japanese-trained horses face ten challengers from abroad in front of 165,930 spectators. The North American challenge comprised Sandpit (the 7/2 favourite), Paradise Creek, Fraise, Grand Flotilla (Marvelous Crown's older half-brother) and Johann Quatz (winner of the Prix Lupin when trained in France). The European contingent comprised Hernando, Apple Tree (Grand Prix de Saint-Cloud, Coronation Cup) and Raintrap (Canadian International Stakes). The other overseas runners were Jeune from Australia and Rough Habit from New Zealand. Starting at odds of 9.6/1 Marvelous Crown, with Katsumi Minai in the saddle, was the most fancied of the Japanese horses ahead of Royce and Royce, Nice Nature and Fujiyama Kenzan. Sandpit went to the front in the early stages and established a clear lead as Minai settled Marvelous Crown on the inside in third place alongside Johann Quatz and Fujiyama Kenzan. Sandpit gave way in the straight and Paradise Creek took the lead from Royce and Royce, but Marvelous Crown continued to make along the rail. The Japanese gelding caught the American challenger in the final stride and won by a nose with Royce and Royce taking third ahead of Hernando. Hinai admitted "I was not sure if I won until I saw the scoreboard".

1995, 1996 & 1997: later career
Marvelous Crown remained in training but made few appearances and never threatened to repeat his form of 1994. As a five-year-old his best effort in three races came when he finished fourth behind Kanetsu Cross in the Naruo Kinen. He returned after an absence of a year to run sixth on dirt at Urawa in December 1996 and was pulled-up with an injury on his final start at Funabashi on 27 January 1997.

Marvelous Crown did not race again and lived in retirement in Hokkaido before dying on 2 June 2007 at the age of seventeen.

Pedigree

Marvelous Crown was inbred 4 × 4 to Princequillo, meaning that this stallion appears twice in the fourth generation of his pedigree.

References 

1990 racehorse births
2007 racehorse deaths
Racehorses bred in Japan
Racehorses trained in Japan
Thoroughbred family 13-a
Japan Cup winners